This name should not be confused with the name Aelita.

Aleta may refer to:

Fictional characters
 Queen Aleta, wife of Prince Valiant, Queen of the Misty Isles in the comic strip Prince Valiant
 Princess Aleta in the television series The Legend of Prince Valiant
 Aleta Ogord of the Guardians of the Galaxy

People
 Aleta Baun, Indonesian environmental activist
 Aleta Fenceroy (1948–2006), American LGBT activist
 Aleta Freel (1907–1935), American stage actress
 Aleta Mitchell, American film, television and theatre actress
 Aleta Arthur Trauger (born 1945), US federal judge

Geographical locations
 Aleta Wendo (woreda), one of the 77 woredas in the Southern Nations, Nationalities and Peoples' Region of Ethiopia
 Aleta Wendo, the administrative center of the woreda

Other
 West Aleta, a ship of the Western Pipe and Steel Company

See also
 Aelita (disambiguation)
 Alita (disambiguation)
 Elita (disambiguation)